Siberia is an American supernatural drama television series shot in the style of a reality television show where 16 contestants must survive in the Siberian territory of Tunguska. Shortly after arrival, the contestants notice strange things and are abandoned by the production of the reality show. The show was filmed in Birds Hill Provincial Park just north of Winnipeg, Manitoba, Canada. It premiered on NBC on July 1, 2013.

It was met with generally favorable reviews from critics and viewers, with average viewership per episode coming in around 2.03 million viewers. The first season concluded on September 16, 2013. The show was independently financed and only licensed to NBC and therefore has not been officially cancelled. The producers were, at one point, in talks to renew the series either on NBC or another platform. Siberia was re-aired on June 25, 2020 on Tubi.

Premise
Sixteen reality-show contestants, each hoping to win $500,000, arrive in a Siberian forest to take part in a reality show. Two are immediately eliminated, and fourteen settle in for the contest. The unexpected death of a fellow contestant throws them off, but they eventually all accept it as an accident. Strange events continue to happen, and when a contestant is injured and no help arrives, they realize they will have to band together to survive in a land they do not understand. More unusual events happen that parallel the ones natives experienced 100 years earlier during the Tunguska event.

The show is described as having a "Lost-meets-Survivor premise", and is compared to The Blair Witch Project and The River.

Cast
 Joyce Giraud as Joyce, an actress hired to play the role of Carolina, a bartender from Bogota, Colombia.
 Johnny Wactor as Johnny, a competitive bull rider from Jedburg, SC.
 Esther Anderson as Esther, a model from Melbourne, Australia. 
 Miljan Milosevic as Miljan, a club DJ from Podgorica, Montenegro. 
 Daniel David Sutton as Daniel, a computer programmer from Royalton, MN.
 Neeko O.J. Skervin as Neeko, a professional rugby player from London, United Kingdom.
 Irene Yee as Irene, a fashion designer from Taipei, Taiwan. 
 Sam Dobbins as Sam, a bouncer from Brooklyn, NY. 
 Sabina Akhmedova as Sabina, a retired soldier from Haifa, Israel.
 Natalie Ann Scheetz as Natalie, a veterinary assistant from Santa Barbara, CA 
 Anne-Marie Mueschke as Annie, a graphic artist from New Orleans, LA. 
 Victoria Hill as Victoria, a sales clerk from Winnipeg, Manitoba, Canada
 George Dickson as George, an accountant from Louisville, KY. 
 Thomas Mountain as Tommy, an environmental activist from Boston, MA. 
 Berglind Icey as Berglind, a journalist from Reykjavik, Iceland. 
 Harpreet Turka as Harpreet, a graduate student from Washington, D.C. 
 Jonathon Buckley as Jonathon, the host.

Episodes

Reception 
On Rotten Tomatoes season 1 has a score of 55% based on reviews from 11 critics. On Metacritic it has a score of 53% based on reviews from 5 critics.

DVD releases
On March 11, 2014 Lions Gate Entertainment released Siberia - Season one on DVD in Region 1 with all 11 episodes on a 3-disc set.

References

External links

 
 

2010s American drama television series
2010s American parody television series
2013 American television series debuts
2013 American television series endings
English-language television shows
NBC original programming
Reality television series parodies
Television series about television
Television shows set in Siberia